Raisin City (formerly, Raisin) is a census-designated place (CDP) in Fresno County, California, United States. The population was 380 at the 2010 census, up from 165 at the 2000 census.

Geography

History
The first post office was established in 1907.

Demographics

2010
The 2010 United States Census reported that Raisin City had a population of 380. The racial makeup of Raisin City was 123 (32.4%) White, 5 (1.3%) African American, 31 (8.2%) Native American, 6 (1.6%) Asian, 0 (0.0%) Pacific Islander, 203 (53.4%) from other races, and 12 (3.2%) from two or more races. Hispanic or Latino of any race were 308 persons (81.1%).

The Census reported that 380 people (100% of the population) lived in households, 0 (0%) lived in non-institutionalized group quarters, and 0 (0%) were institutionalized.

There were 81 households, out of which 48 (59.3%) had children under the age of 18 living in them, 42 (51.9%) were opposite-sex married couples living together, 15 (18.5%) had a female householder with no husband present, 13 (16.0%) had a male householder with no wife present.  There were 7 (8.6%) unmarried opposite-sex partnerships, and 0 (0%) same-sex married couples or partnerships. 8 households (9.9%) were made up of individuals, and 3 (3.7%) had someone living alone who was 65 years of age or older. The average household size was 4.69.  There were 70 families (86.4% of all households); the average family size was 4.90.

The population was spread out, with 138 people (36.3%) under the age of 18, 53 people (13.9%) aged 18 to 24, 103 people (27.1%) aged 25 to 44, 61 people (16.1%) aged 45 to 64, and 25 people (6.6%) who were 65 years of age or older.  The median age was 24.8 years. For every 100 females, there were 128.9 males.  For every 100 females age 18 and over, there were 124.1 males.

The homeowner vacancy rate was 0%; the rental vacancy rate was 8.9%.  175 people (46.1% of the population) lived in owner-occupied housing units and 205 people (53.9%) lived in rental housing units.

2000
As of the census of 2000, there were 165 people, 42 households, and 37 families residing in the CDP. The racial makeup of the CDP was 60.00% White, 8.48% Native American, 6.06% Asian, 19.39% from other races, and 6.06% from two or more races. Hispanic or Latino of any race were 60.00% of the population

There were 42 households, out of which 47.6% had children under the age of 18 living with them, 64.3% were married couples living together, 16.7% had a female householder with no husband present, and 11.9% were non-families. 11.9% of all households were made up of individuals, and 7.1% had someone living alone who was 65 years of age or older. The average household size was 3.93 and the average family size was 4.22.

In the CDP, the population was spread out, with 32.1% under the age of 18, 10.9% from 18 to 24, 23.6% from 25 to 44, 20.0% from 45 to 64, and 13.3% who were 65 years of age or older. The median age was 30 years. For every 100 females, there were 91.9 males. For every 100 females age 18 and over, there were 100.0 males.

The median income for a household in the CDP was $24,167, and the median income for a family was $23,958. Males had a median income of $12,083 versus $25,000 for females. The per capita income for the CDP was $11,544. About 17.6% of families and 21.3% of the population were below the poverty line, including 47.1% of those under the age of eighteen and none of those 65 or over.

References

Census-designated places in Fresno County, California
Populated places established in 1907
Census-designated places in California